Süleyman Koç (born 9 June 1989) is a Turkish-German footballer who plays for Turkish club Erzurumspor.

Koç was sentenced in December 2011 by the Landgericht Berlin to three years and nine months in prison for a number of robberies and battery. In the summer of 2012, he was moved to an open prison, thus being able to return to playing for SV Babelsberg 03. In January 2014, he joined 2. Bundesliga club SC Paderborn 07.

On 10 January 2019, Koç joined Adana Demirspor on a 2.5-year contract.

References

External links 
 

1989 births
Footballers from Berlin
Criminals from Berlin
German people of Turkish descent
Living people
German footballers
Association football midfielders
Berliner AK 07 players
Türkiyemspor Berlin players
SV Babelsberg 03 players
SC Paderborn 07 players
Çaykur Rizespor footballers
Adana Demirspor footballers
Büyükşehir Belediye Erzurumspor footballers
Oberliga (football) players
Regionalliga players
3. Liga players
2. Bundesliga players
Bundesliga players
Süper Lig players
TFF First League players
German expatriate footballers
Expatriate footballers in Turkey
German expatriate sportspeople in Turkey